Philip Brodie (born 3 April 1975) is a British actor and writer, best known for his role of Vivian "Jaws" Wright on Dream Team (2004–2005).

Career
His career began in theatre. He then progressed to stand-up in London and Edinburgh and had a stint in the West End.

In 2004, he was cast as Vivian "Jaws" Wright in the Sky One TV series Dream Team. His character was shown to battle OCD, undergo a volatile relationship with his wife and football career and serious mental health issues. In July 2008, he was ranked fifteenth on Sky One's "50 Greatest Hard Men" list.

Brodie's one-man show, Tailor Made Love earned him critical acclaim. The actor has appeared in such films as World of the Dead: The Zombie Diaries (2011) in which he played the lead role, A Landscape of Lies (2011), Mythica: The Necromancer (2015) and starred in Unlocked (2017) alongside Michael Douglas, Toni Collette, Noomi Rapace, John Malkovich and Orlando Bloom. He also starred as Colin Kay in Broken News (2005) and George M. Hendee in Harley and the Davidsons (2016). His stage work includes Midnight's Pumpkin (Kneehigh Theatre), Wah Wah Girls (Sadler's Wells Theatre/Theatre Royal Stratford East), Horse Piss for Blood (Plymouth Theatre Royal) and Decade (Theatre 503).

Filmography

References

External links

1975 births
Living people
English male television actors
21st-century English male actors
Male actors from Surrey